Ricardo Jesus da Silva (born 16 May 1985) is a Brazilian former football striker.

Career

Da Silva has played for Sport Club Internacional, PFC Spartak Nalchik and PFC CSKA Moscow.

Several enquiries were made by Italian clubs regarding his availability but CSKA refused to sell.

On 3 January 2010, Larissa F.C. signed da Silva on loan from PFC CSKA Moscow until the end of the season. He had a very successful spell at Larissa F.C. and became a fans' favourite which led to several Greek teams approaching CSKA to sign the player.

On 21 January 2014, CSKA announced that Da Silva had left them permanently to sign for Querétaro.

Career honours

Club
CSKA Moscow
Russian Cup (2): 2007–08, 2008–09
Russian Super Cup (1): 2009

Thai Honda FC

Thai Division 1 League Champion; 2016

Individual
Campeonato Goiano Top Scorer: 2013

References

External links

1985 births
Living people
Brazilian footballers
Brazilian expatriate footballers
Expatriate footballers in Russia
Expatriate footballers in Greece
Expatriate footballers in Mexico
Sport Club Internacional players
PFC Spartak Nalchik players
PFC CSKA Moscow players
Russian Premier League players
Athlitiki Enosi Larissa F.C. players
Querétaro F.C. footballers
Super League Greece players
Associação Atlética Ponte Preta players
Associação Portuguesa de Desportos players
Avaí FC players
Al Urooba Club players
UAE First Division League players
Atlético Clube Goianiense players
Campeonato Brasileiro Série A players
Association football forwards
Sportspeople from Campinas